Polemonium pulcherrimum is a species of flowering plant in the phlox family known by several common names, including beautiful Jacob's-ladder, showy Jacob's-ladder, and skunk-leaved polemonium. It is native to western North America from Alaska and Yukon to Arizona and New Mexico, where it can be found in many types of mountain habitat, including alpine talus and rock cracks at high elevations. It is a common and widespread wildflower in several regions. It is a perennial herb producing a clump of several erect stem approaching a maximum height of 30 centimeters. The leaves are mostly basal, with smaller ones arranged along the stem. The leaves are made up of several pairs of lance-shaped to oval or round leaflets. The herbage is lightly hairy, densely glandular, sticky, and strongly scented, the odor reminiscent of skunk. The showy inflorescence is a dense elongated or headlike cluster of bell-shaped flowers each just under a centimeter wide. The flower is deep to bright or pale blue to nearly white with a yellow throat.

References

External links
Jepson Manual Treatment
Washington Burke Museum
Royal BC Museum: Showy Jacob's Ladder
Photo gallery

pulcherrimum
Flora of Idaho
Flora of North America
Flora without expected TNC conservation status